The Hinckley 43 (McCurdy & Rhodes) is an American sailboat that was designed by McCurdy & Rhodes as a cruiser and first built in 1990.

The design is a development of the 1982 McCurdy & Rhodes designed Sou'wester 42/43.

The design was originally marketed by the manufacturer as the Hinckley 43, but is now usually referred to as the Hinckley 43 (McCurdy & Rhodes) to differentiate it from the unrelated 1976 Hinckley 43 (Hood) and the 1979 Hinckley 43 (Hood)-2 designs.

Production
The design was built by Hinckley Yachts in the United States, starting in 1990, but it is now out of production.

Design
The Hinckley 43 (McCurdy & Rhodes) is a recreational keelboat, built predominantly of fiberglass, with wood trim. It has a masthead sloop rig; a raked stem; a raised counter, reverse transom; an internally mounted spade-type rudder controlled by a wheel and a fixed fin keel with a retractable centerboard. It displaces  and carries  of lead ballast.

The design has sleeping accommodation for six people, with a double "V"-berth in the bow cabin, a "U"-shaped settee around a drop-down table and a straight settee berth in the main cabin and an aft cabin with a single berth on the starboard side. The galley is located on the port side just forward of the companionway ladder. The galley is "U"-shaped and is equipped with a three-burner stove, an ice box and a double sink. A navigation station is opposite the galley, on the starboard side. The head is located just aft of the bow cabin on the starboard side.

See also
List of sailing boat types

References

Keelboats
1990s sailboat type designs
Sailing yachts
Sailboat type designs by McCurdy & Rhodes
Sailboat types built by Hinckley Yachts